Marcos Carlos Cruz Martínez (born 16 March 1949) is a Mexican teacher and politician affiliated with the Party of the Democratic Revolution. As of 2014 he served as Senator of the LVIII and LIX Legislatures of the Mexican Congress representing Durango and as Deputy of the LIV, LVI and LXI Legislatures.

References

1949 births
Living people
Politicians from Coahuila
Members of the Senate of the Republic (Mexico)
Members of the Chamber of Deputies (Mexico)
Party of the Democratic Revolution politicians
People from Frontera, Coahuila
21st-century Mexican politicians
20th-century Mexican politicians